Elias Scheres (née Shadrock; born 2 July 1990 in Tokoroa, New Zealand) is a New Zealand netball player in the ANZ Championship, playing for the Central Pulse. Scheres captained the New Zealand Secondary Schools team that won the International School Girls Championship in June 2008. She was also a member of the New Zealand U21 team in 2007 and 2008, and made the preliminary U21 squad in 2009.

References

External links
 2016 Central Pulse Profile

1990 births
Living people
New Zealand netball players
New Zealand Māori netball players
People educated at Western Heights High School
Sportspeople from Tokoroa
Waikato Bay of Plenty Magic players
Central Pulse players
ANZ Championship players